Erich Arthur Fritz Schwab (December 31, 1919 in Berlin – November 24, 2006) was a Swiss race walker. He won two Olympic medals over 10 kilometres in 1948 and 1952. In addition he won two medals at the European Championships in 1946 and 1950.

His father Arthur Tell Schwab was an Olympic silver medalist in 1936.

Notes
This article is based on a translation of an article from the German Wikipedia.

1919 births
2006 deaths
Swiss male racewalkers
Athletes (track and field) at the 1948 Summer Olympics
Athletes (track and field) at the 1952 Summer Olympics
Olympic athletes of Switzerland
Olympic silver medalists for Switzerland
Olympic bronze medalists for Switzerland
European Athletics Championships medalists
Medalists at the 1952 Summer Olympics
Medalists at the 1948 Summer Olympics
Olympic silver medalists in athletics (track and field)
Olympic bronze medalists in athletics (track and field)